Zsombor Deák (born 17 August 1989) is a professional triathlete from Romania. Zsombor is a multiple top 5 World Cup finisher and multiple National Champion.

Personal life

Zsombor grew up in Sfântu Gheorghe, Romania. He was a very energetic boy and also has been a vegetarian since the age of 3. Soon he realised he is able to run and exercise much more than his peers. At age 14 he moved to Hungary to continue his studies at the Nyíregyházi Vasvári Pál Gimnázium Sports School. While in high school, a friend introduced him to triathlon. It was love at first sight. Zsombor completed his studies in 2011 in Cluj-Napoca at Babeş-Bolyai University. He was keen on further developing his sports career, so he moved to Australia in 2013.

Triathlon career

Zsombor attended several running, duathlon and triathlon races since high school. He had some very outstanding results both nationally and internationally. Then he moved to Australia and attended his first world cup as an adult, professional triathlete. On his very first Ironman 70.3, he finished in 4th place (Ironman 70.3 TAIWAN). Since then, he attends 6-10 World Cups (Ironman, Challenge Family, ITU) a year, usually ranking in the top 10. He travels all year round spending his winters training and racing in Australia and Asia. He loves exotic places and always looks for challenges. In 2016 he founded his own brand, the “IDEAL with Challenges” to motivate his followers with his life-story. He achieved everything with hard work and perseverance, thus his motto is: "Dream big, achieve more!"
He is vegetarian since the age of 3.

Results
 2021- Kotor (MONTENEGRO) - 5th Place /Ocean Lava Montenegro
 2020- Budapest (HUNGARY) - 1st Place /Urban Games
 2020- Budapest (HUNGARY) - 1st Place /Nato Run
 2019- Wenzhou (CHINA) - 9th Place /Middle Distance World Cup
 2019- Zurich (SWITZERLAND) - 10th Place /Ironman Switzerland
 2019- Tg Mures (ROMANIA) - 8th Place /Middle Distance European Championship
 2019- Taitung (TAIWAN) - 1st Place /Puyaman Triathlon
 2018- Penghu (TAIWAN) - 7th Place /Ironman Taiwan
 2018- Bidgoszcz (POLAND) - 3rd Place /Ocean Lava Poland
 2018- Robertvile (BELGIUM) - 2nd Place /Ocean Lava Belgium
 2017- Penghu (TAIWAN) - 6th Place /Ironman Taiwan
 2017- Herning (DENMARK) - 14th Place /Middle Distance European Championship
 2017- Bintan (INDONESIA) - 7th Place /Ironman 70.3 Bintan
 2017- Quijing (CHINA) - 9th Place /Ironman 70.3 Quijing
 2016- Xiamen (CHINA) - 7th Place /Ironman 70.3 Xiamen
 2016- Chungju (SOUTH KOREA) - 3rd Place /Ironman 70.3 Chungju
 2016- Da Nang (VIETNAM) - 9th Place /Ironman 70.3 Vietnam
 2016- Sungailiat (INDONESIA) - 2nd Place / Sungaliat Half Ironman Indonesia
 2016- Taitung (TAIWAN) - 10th Place  / Ironman 70.3 Taiwan
 2015-Kenting (TAIWAN) - 8th Place /Ironman 70.3 Taiwan
 2015-Gurye (SOUTH KOREA) - 10th Place /Ironman 70.3 Gurye
 2015-Incheon (SOUTH KOREA) - 9th Place /Ironman 70.3 Incheon
 2015- Kenting (TAIWAN) - 11th Place /Ironman Taiwan
 2014-Bahrain(BAHRAIN) - 28th Place /Challenge Bahrain (youngest pro athlete!)
 2014-Kenting (TAIWAN) - 8th Place /Ironman 70.3 Taiwan
 2014-Langkawi(MALAYSIA) - 8th Place /Ironman Malaysia
 2014-Taitung (TAIWAN) - 4th Place /Challenge Taiwan 113
 2013-Kenting (TAIWAN) - 4th Place /Ironman 70.3 Taiwan
 2013-Bintan (INDONESIA) - 4th Place /Metaman Half-Ironman
 Multiple Romanian champion
 Multiple half-marathon and marathon champion
 Multiple powerman duathlon U23 podium

References

External links 
Zsombor Deak Official Website
Ironman Official Webpage: Croneborg Wins in Big Wet, No Stopping Wu in Taiwan
Háromszék Napilap: Deák harmadik Dél-Koreában
Háromszék Napilap: Deák Zsombor élménybeszámolója
Morfondír: Akinek nem létezik lehetetlen: Deák Zsombor triatlonista
Erdély.ma: Deák Zsombor profi triatlonista előadássorozata Erdélyben
Video: Ironman 70.3 Taiwan

1989 births
Living people
Romanian male triathletes
Sportspeople from Cluj-Napoca